The Bangubangu are a Bantu people from the eastern Democratic Republic of Congo, primarily in the Kabambare Territory. They speak the Bangubangu language. They also live in Tanzania, where they migrated during the 19th century and are usually known by the umbrella term Manyema, which also includes other ethnic groups originating from the same area.

References

External links
 Bangubangu People

 

Ethnic groups in the Democratic Republic of the Congo
Ethnic groups in Tanzania